Herman Hoffman Philip (July 13, 1872 – October 31, 1951) was an American diplomat and career foreign service officer.

Early life

Herman Hoffman Philip was born on July 13, 1872, to William Henry Philip and Eliza Worthington in Washington, D.C. and later attended the University of Cambridge. During the Spanish–American War he served in the Rough Riders where he would befriend future President Theodore Roosevelt.

Career

In 1902, he was appointed as the United States Deputy Consul General in Tangier. From 1902 to 1905, he served as the Vice Consul in Tangier and later as Consul General in Tangier from 1905 to 1906. During his tenure as a diplomat in Morocco he participated as a negotiator in the Perdicaris affair.

On July 20, 1908, he was appointed to serve as the first Consul General to the Ethiopian Empire while the Senate was in recess. The Senate recommissioned him on December 9, 1908, and he presented his credentials on July 6, 1909, officially opening relations between the United States and Ethiopia. However, due to health problems he only served for one year. The vice consul general in Ethiopia would maintain relations until his death three years later. The British took control of relations until the consulate was formally closed as there wasn't a high enough level of commerce to justify another commercial treaty with Ethiopia. Diplomatic relations between the United States and Ethiopia would not be reestablished until Addison E. Southard was appointed in 1927.

He served as United States Ambassador to Colombia from 1917 to 1922. He served as United States Ambassador to Uruguay from 1922 to 1925. He served as United States Ambassador to Iran from 1925 to 1928. He served as United States Ambassador to Norway from 1930 to 1935.  He served as United States Ambassador to Chile from 1935 to 1937.

On October 31, 1951, he died in Santa Barbara, California.

References

External links

1872 births
1951 deaths
Ambassadors of the United States to Chile
Ambassadors of the United States to Colombia
Ambassadors of the United States to Ethiopia
Ambassadors of the United States to Iran
Ambassadors of the United States to Norway
Ambassadors of the United States to Uruguay
People from New York (state)
United States Foreign Service personnel
20th-century American diplomats